Springdale is a historic plantation house located near Mathews, Mathews County, Virginia. The original section of the house may date to about 1750. Originally the house was a frame Georgian style two-story, side-passage gambrel roof dwelling with a brick cellar. A one-story shed addition was added in the late-18th or early-19th century. This section of the house was renovated between about 1774 and 1824.  The house was expanded by 1840, with a -story, Federal style south wing and -story hyphen connecting the two wings.  Also on the property is a contributing smokehouse (c. 1774–1825) and archaeological site.

It was listed on the National Register of Historic Places in 2013.

References

Plantation houses in Virginia
Houses on the National Register of Historic Places in Virginia
Houses completed in 1750
Georgian architecture in Virginia
Federal architecture in Virginia
Houses in Mathews County, Virginia
National Register of Historic Places in Mathews County, Virginia